The British Aerosol Manufacturers' Association (BAMA) is a UK trade association based in Stevenage representing companies involved in the aerosol supply chain, including suppliers of components and ingredients to fillers and marketers.

History and objectives

It was established in 1961. 2008 marked 80 years since  Rotheim's patent for aerosols was approved in the UK and BAMA as the trade association, marked this through a trade and consumer public relations programme and by producing a series of marketing materials for member companies. BAMA also provides information to local authorities, households and businesses on recycling aerosols.

BAMA's aims are to:
 Promote the aerosol and encourage innovation
 Set high standards in safety, good manufacturing practice and on environmental issues
 Present industry's view to legislators, the media and key opinion formers

Members 
Members include:
 AkzoNobel
 Beiersdorf
 DuPont
 GlaxoSmithKline
 ICI Paints
 Precision Valve - formed by Robert Abplanalp, inventor of the aerosol valve
 Procter & Gamble
 Reckitt Benckiser
 Rentokil Initial
 SC Johnson
 Unilever
 Swallowfield Plc

References

External links 
 British Aerosol Manufacturers' Association
 BAMA: Recycle more
 FEA - European Aerosol Federation

Video clips
 Sue Rogers in April 2011
 History of aerosols in April 2011

Aerosol sprays
Chemical industry in the United Kingdom
1961 establishments in the United Kingdom
Industrial gases
Organisations based in the City of Westminster
Organizations established in 1961
Trade associations based in the United Kingdom